The 1930–31 Ottawa Senators season was the club's 14th season in the NHL, 46th overall. The club failed to make the playoffs, attendance continued to fall, and the team was losing money.

Off-season
Prior to the season beginning, the Senators sent future Hall of Fame defenceman King Clancy to the Toronto Maple Leafs in exchange for $35,000($ in  dollars) and two players.

Regular season

Art Gagne led the team offensively, scoring a team high 19 goals, while tying with Bill Touhey for the lead in points at 30.

Alec Connell would get the majority of action in the Senators net, winning all ten games the Senators won and posting a 3.01 GAA.  Bill Beveridge would also get some time in goal, however he finished 0–8–0 with a GAA of 3.69.

The Senators would finish in last place for the first time in team history, and with the Great Depression taking its toll on the team, the NHL allowed the Senators and the Philadelphia Quakers to suspend operations for the 1931–32 NHL season, renting the players for $25,000.

Final standings

Record vs. opponents

Schedule and results

Player statistics

Regular season
Scoring

Goaltending

Playoffs
The Senators did not qualify for the playoffs

Transactions
The Senators were involved in the following transactions during the 1930–31 season.

Trades

Free agents signed

See also
 1930–31 NHL season

References

SHRP Sports
The Internet Hockey Database
National Hockey League Guide & Record Book 2007

Ottawa Senators (original) seasons
Ottawa
Ottawa